Antolín Luis de Santiago y Juárez (born 9 October 1918) is a Spanish former politician, lawyer, professor and journalist He was a member of the FET y de las JONS party, and was the Mayor of Valladolid from 12 August 1971 to 12 February 1974. He was worked as a representative in the city of information and tourism in Valladolid. He served as the civil governor of the Province of Cádiz from February 1974 to August 1977, who was also re-elected to the civil governor of the Province of Burgos, in office from August 1977 to July 1980. He retired from politics after 1980. He was the procurator in the francoist courts from 1971 to 1974. After his son came into politics, he moved away from politics.

Biography
Antolín was born in Salamanca, Castile and León on October 9, 1918. He is married, and has a son named José Antonio de Santiago-Juárez, who is also a politician. He graduated from the University of Valladolid. He celebrated his 100th birthday in 2018. He joined the university as a professor for some time. He was advocated in the court of Valladolid and was engaged in the profession of journalism.

References 

 
1918 births
Living people
People from Salamanca
20th-century Spanish politicians
FET y de las JONS politicians
Spanish centenarians
Men centenarians